Coleophora anisota is a moth of the family Coleophoridae. It is found in Bermuda.

References

anisota
Moths described in 1927
Moths of the Caribbean